Isadore Perlman (April 12, 1915 – August 3, 1991) was an American nuclear chemist noted for his research of Alpha particle decay.

The National Academy of Sciences called Perlman "a world leader on the systematics of alpha decay".
He was also recognized for his research of nuclear structure of the heavy elements.
He was also noted for his isolation of Curium,

as well as for fission of tantalum, bismuth, lead, thallium and platinum.

Perlman discovered uses of radioactive iodine and phosphorus for medical purposes.
He played a key role in Manhattan Project's plutonium production.

Neutron activation analysis
He was also a top expert in the field of archaeometry. He pioneered high-precision methods of neutron activation analysis at the Lawrence Berkeley Laboratory in the US. Neutron activation analysis helps to determine the origin of ancient pottery and other artifacts through the analysis of the clay from which they were made. He was helped in the project by another noted scientist Frank Asaro. Second millennium BC pottery known as Cypriot Bichrome ware was one of the first archaeological projects that Perlman and Asaro undertook.

Recognition
Perlman was a member of the National Academy of Sciences,
a member of the American Academy of Arts and Sciences, a member of the Danish Royal Academy,
chairman of the Department of Chemistry of the University of California, Berkeley,
head of the Nuclear Chemistry Division and an associate director of the Lawrence Radiation Laboratory.

Legacy 
In 2006, Perlman's former student and collaborator Frank Asaro transferred archives of their work at Lawrence Berkeley National Laboratory to the University of Missouri Research Reactor Center with the request that they transcribe these data and share them with the scientific community. After more than a decade, a (nearly) comprehensive archive of the work of Asaro, Perlman, and Michel on the geochemistry of archaeological and geological samples was produced by Matthew T. Boulanger. This archive was provided to the scientific community via the Digital Archaeological Record (tDAR). The knowledge and experiences gained through working with these records has been used to recommend best practices to modern laboratories producing similar data to ensure that they remain useful into the future.

Notable awards 
 1939     Rosenberg Fellowship
 1940     Upjohn Research Fellowship
 1952     California Section Award, American Chemical Society
 1955     Guggenheim Fellow
 1960     Ernest O. Lawrence Award, Atomic Energy Commission
 1963     Guggenheim Fellow
 1964     American Chemical Society Award for Nuclear Applications in Chemistry

Chronology 
 April 12, 1915 born in Milwaukee, Wisconsin
 1936: BS,  University of California, Berkeley (Chemistry)
 1940: PhD, University of California, Berkeley (Physiology)
 1936–1937: Paraffin Company, Inc., Control Chemist
 1940–1941: University of California, Berkeley, Upjohn Fellow
 1942–1943: Manhattan Project, Chicago Metallurgical Laboratory, Researcher
 1943–1944: Manhattan Project, Oak Ridge Clinton Laboratory, Senior Chemist
 1944–1945: Manhattan Project, Hanford Engineering Works (GE), Senior Chemist
 1945–1974: University of California, Berkeley, Associate Professor to Professor of Chemistry
 1963:      elected to National Academy of Sciences
 1974–1988: Hebrew University, Professor of Archeology and Chemistry
 1988–1991: Lawrence Berkeley National Laboratory, Researcher
 August 3, 1991 died in Los Alamitos, California

References

External links
 

1915 births
1991 deaths
20th-century American chemists
University of California, Berkeley faculty
University of California, Berkeley alumni
Members of the United States National Academy of Sciences
Scientists from Milwaukee
Nuclear chemists
Manhattan Project people